Mohammad Asaduddin (born 18 May 1990) is an Indian cricketer. He made his first-class debut for Goa in the 2018–19 Ranji Trophy on 6 December 2018. Asaduddin's last competitive appearance prior to his first-class debut had come in 2009.

Early life and career
His father is Mohammad Azharuddin, who captained the India cricket team in the 1980s and 1990s. He made his first-class cricket debut in 2018.

Personal life
He married Anam Mirza, the sister of Sania Mirza in 2019.

References

External links
 

1990 births
Living people
Indian cricketers
Goa cricketers